The wildlife of Equatorial Guinea is composed of its flora and fauna.

Overview
There are approximately 3,250 species of plants. The country is found in region of the world with high animal diversity. There are at least 194 mammal species; 418 species of birds, and 91 reptile species.

Fauna
Mammals are found throughout Equatorial Guinea. Within Equatorial Guinea there are gorillas, Leopards, chimpanzees, a small population of African Elephants, hippopotamus, cape buffalo, crocodiles, pythons and various monkeys. 

The gorillas of Equatorial Guinea are of the subspecies western lowland gorilla and the chimpanzees of Equatorial Guinea are the species common chimpanzee. There is only one species of African elephants in Equatorial Guinea, the African forest elephant. Despite poaching, the leopard is widespread in Equatorial Guinea and is found even in the suburbs of some major cities. For a full list of wildlife in Equatorial Guinea see List of Mammals in Equatorial Guinea.

References

External links
 Flora de Guinea, Spanish-language database about flora of Equatorial Guinea. Handled by the Royal Botanic Garden of Madrid.

Biota of Equatorial Guinea
Equatorial Guinea
Rainforests of Africa